Metro Transit may refer to:

 King County Metro, formerly branded as "Metro Transit", serving King County, Washington and the Seattle metropolitan area
 Metro Transit (Halifax), rebranded as Halifax Transit, serving Halifax Regional Municipality, Nova Scotia
 Metro Transit (Kalamazoo), serving Kalamazoo, Michigan
 Metro Transit (Madison), serving Madison, Wisconsin
 Metro Transit (Minnesota), serving the Minneapolis-Saint Paul metropolitan area
 Metro Transit (Oklahoma City), rebranded as Embark, serving the Oklahoma City metropolitan area
 Metro Transit (Omaha), serving the Omaha, Nebraska metropolitan area
 Metro Transit (St. Louis), serving the St. Louis metropolitan area

See also
 Metro (disambiguation)
 Metro Transit Police (disambiguation)
 Metropolitan Transit Commission (disambiguation)